The 1991–92 season of the NOFV-Oberliga was the first season of the league at tier three (III) of the German football league system after German reunification.

The NOFV-Oberliga was split into three divisions, NOFV-Oberliga Nord, NOFV-Oberliga Mitte and NOFV-Oberliga Süd. The champions of each division entered into a play-off with the champion of the Oberliga Nord, VfL Wolfsburg. Each team played each other home and away, with Wolfsburg gaining promotion to the 1992–93 2. Fußball-Bundesliga.

North

Central

South

2. Bundesliga play-off 
FC Berlin, 1. FC Union Berlin and FSV Zwickau qualified for the promotion round to the 2. Bundesliga by winning their respective divisions of the NOFV-Oberliga. VfL Wolfsburg was also assigned to the promotion round by winning the Oberliga Nord. The four teams faced each other in two legs and thus each played six matches to determine. VfL Wolfsburg ultimately prevailed, which meant that no team from the former East Germany achieved promotion.

External links 
 NOFV-Online – official website of the North-East German Football Association 

NOFV-Oberliga seasons
3
Germ